Trichroa oberthuri is a species of beetle in the family Cerambycidae, and the only species in the genus Trichroa. It was described by Fairmaire in 1892.

References

Dorcasominae
Beetles described in 1892
Monotypic beetle genera